A small engine is the general term for a wide range of small-displacement, low-powered internal combustion engines used to power lawn mowers, generators, concrete mixers and many other machines that require independent power sources. These engines often have simple designs, for example an air-cooled single-cylinder petrol engine with a pull-cord starter, capacitor discharge ignition and a gravity-fed carburettor.

Engines of similar design and displacement are also used in smaller vehicles such as motorcycles, motor scooters, all-terrain vehicles, and go-karts.

Characteristics 
The engines are small in both physical dimensions and power output, relative to larger automobile engines. Production cost is often a key consideration for small engines, resulting in relatively simple designs (compared with automotive engines, for example).

The most common configuration is a single-cylinder engines that is air-cooled. The combustion cycle can be either two-stroke (which results in a lighter engine for a given power output) or four-stroke (which produce lower levels of exhaust gas emissions). The fuel is usually either petrol or diesel.

In 1973, a small Wankel (rotary) engine manufactured by NSU was used in a lawn mower.

Design

Electrical system 
When a manual starter system is used (such as a recoil starter with a pull-cord), only a basic electrical system is required, since the system's only purpose was to power the spark plug. Older engines used a magneto to achieve this, while newer engines often use a capacitor discharge ignition (CDI) system with an ignition coil. These systems do not require a battery or charging system.

Before the invention of the recoil starter, a notched pulley was attached to the engine's flywheel; the operator would manually wind a rope around the pulley then jerk the rope to rotate the engine so that it would start. Following the introduction of the sprag clutch in the 1960s, the "impulse" or "wind-up" starter was popular for a brief period. These used a heavy spring which the operator placed under tension using a rotating crank handle. However, these systems were potentially dangerous as it was possible to leave the starter wound up and ready to start the engine unintentionally, even long after the crank was wound up.

Electric starting, which has become more common over time, requires a more complex electrical system. These engines also require a starter motor, a battery to power it and an alternator to keep a battery charged.

Fuel system
Petrol engines often use simple fuel systems consisting of a float-type carburetor with a fuel tank located above it (so that the fuel is delivered by gravity, avoiding the need for a fuel pump). Sometimes, the fuel tank is located below the carburettor and fuel is delivered using engine vacuum or crankcase pressure pulsations.

Diesel engines use fuel injection.

Governor
Most small engines use a governor to maintain a constant engine speed under varying loads. Some engines also have a mechanism for the user to adjust the engine speed. Rather than directly controlling the opening of the carburetor throttle, this is usually achieved by adjusting the governor, which in turn regulates the engine speed higher or lower.

Valvetrain 
The most common design is an overhead valve configuration, as used by the Honda GX range since the 1980s for example.

A sidevalve configuration is used instead by some engines, owing to its simplicity for both manufacture and basic maintenance. Some engines in recent years, for example the Honda GC series, now use an overhead cam configuration.

Crankshaft
Small engines can have the crankshaft oriented either horizontally or vertically, according to the intended application. Vertical axis engines were originally developed for rotary lawnmowers, but the size of this large market has encouraged a supply of cheap engines and they are now also used for other purposes such as generators.

Manufacturers 
The four largest manufacturers of small engines for power equipment in 2019 were Briggs & Stratton, Honda, Kawasaki and Kohler. Other major players include: Kubota, Yamaha and Liquid Combustion Technology.

Repairs/maintenance 
The repairing of small engines in a vocational occupation. While often touted as a separate job by commercial education institutions, it may also be a skill someone uses as part of a larger job, such as an automotive or agricultural mechanic. Various safety precautions need to be taken when working on small engines.

See also 
 Motorcycle engine
 Non-road engine
 Article on Small SI Engines.

References 

Internal combustion engine